Mikhail Andreyevich Suslov (25 January 1982) was a Soviet statesman during the Cold War. He served as Second Secretary of the Communist Party of the Soviet Union from 1965, and as unofficial chief ideologue of the party until his death in 1982. Suslov was responsible for party democracy and power separation within the Communist Party. His hardline attitude resisting change made him one of the foremost orthodox communist Soviet leaders.

Born in rural Russia in 1902, Suslov became a member of the All-Union Communist Party (Bolsheviks) in 1921 and studied economics for much of the 1920s. He left his job as a teacher in 1931 to pursue politics full-time, becoming one of the many Soviet politicians who took part in the mass repression begun by Joseph Stalin's regime. He was made First Secretary of Stavropol Krai administrative area in 1939. During World War II, Suslov headed the local Stavropol guerrilla movement.

After the war, Suslov became a member of the Organisational Bureau (Orgburo) of the Central Committee in 1946. In June 1950, he was elected to the Presidium of the Supreme Soviet. From 16 October 1952 onwards, he was a full member of the 19th Presidium of the CPSU. In the ensuing shuffle of the Soviet leadership following Stalin's death, Suslov lost much of the recognition and influence he had previously earned. However, by the late 1950s, he had risen to become the leader of the party opposition to First Secretary Nikita Khrushchev. When Khrushchev was ousted in 1964, Suslov supported the establishment of a collective leadership. He also supported inner-party democracy and opposed the reestablishment of the one-man rule as seen during the Stalin and Khrushchev eras. During the Brezhnev era, Suslov was considered to be the party's chief ideologue and second-in-command. His death on 25 January 1982 is viewed as starting the battle to succeed Leonid Brezhnev as general secretary.

Early years and career
Suslov was born in Shakhovskoye, a rural locality in Pavlovsky District, Ulyanovsk Oblast, Russian Empire on 21 November 1902. Suslov began work in the local Komsomol organisation in Saratov in 1918, eventually becoming a member of the Poverty Relief Committee. After working in the Komsomol for nearly three years, Suslov became a member of the All-Union Communist Party (the Bolsheviks) in 1921. After graduating from the rabfak, he studied economics at the Plekhanov Institute of National Economy between 1924 and 1928. In the summer of 1928, after graduating from the Plekhanov institute, he became a graduate student (research fellow) in economics at the Institute of Red Professors, teaching at Moscow State University and at the Industrial Academy.

In 1931, he abandoned teaching in favour of the party apparatus. He became an inspector on the Communist Party's Party Control Commission and on the People's Commissariat of the Workers' and Peasants' Inspectorate. His main task there was to adjudicate large numbers of "personal cases", breaches of discipline, and appeals against expulsion from the party.

In 1933 and 1934, Suslov directed a commission charged with purging the party in the Ural and Chernigov provinces. The purge was organised by Lazar Kaganovich, then Chairman of the Soviet Control Commission. Author Yuri Druzhnikov contends that Suslov was involved with setting up several show trials, and contributed to the Party by expelling all members deviating from the Party line, meaning Trotskyists, Zinovievists, and other left-wing deviationists.

From 1936-1937, Suslov studied at the Postgraduate Course of the Economic Institute of Red Professors. He gained a reputation as a unsociable, modest, and serious student who carefully studied and memorized the works and speeches of Marx, Engels, Lenin, and Stalin and became known for keeping a complete record of their statements on economic and political issues in boxes of cards and file cabinets in his tiny room in a communal apartment. Somehow, Stalin urgently needed Lenin's opinion on one narrow economic issue and dispatched his secretary Lev Mekhlis to locate the answer. Mekhlis, Suslov's classmate at the Institute, approached him and instantly found the necessary quote. An amazed Stalin asked how he managed to find the quote so quickly, upon which Mekhlis introduced Stalin to Suslov. Stalin immediately had Suslov promoted to Party Secretary of Rostov and carried out a purge of the city in 1938. Impressed with his work, Suslov was made First Secretary of the Stavropol Krai's Communist Party in 1939.

Wartime activities (1941–1945)

On the Eastern Front in World War II, Suslov was a member of Military Council of the North Caucasian Front and led the Stavropol Krai Headquarters of the Partisan Divisions (the local guerrilla movement) after the Germans occupied the area. Suslov spent much of his time mobilising workers to fight against the German invaders. The guerrilla movement he led was operated by the regional party cells; Suslov for his part maintained close contact with the Red Army. Suslov also supervised the deportations of Chechens and other Muslim minorities from the Caucasus during the war.

According to Soviet historiography, Suslov's years as a guerrilla fighter were highly successful; however, testimonies from participants differ from the official account. These participants claim that there were a number of organizational problems which reduced their effectiveness on the battlefield. Suslov also suffered badly from tuberculosis, which he had contracted in his youth, that was further exacerbated in the dense partisan forests and hampered his ability as an effective combatant. Fearing further relapses, for the rest of his life, he continued to wear galoshes on his shoes as well as a hat and raincoat at all times, even in the hot summer weather, which made him the butt of jokes among his colleagues in Brezhnev's Politburo. 

Suslov later purged the Baltic region in the aftermath of the Great Patriotic War. From 1944 to 1946, he chaired the Central Committee Bureau for Lithuanian Affairs. Anti-Soviet samizdat literature from the height of his power in the 1970s would accuse him of being personally responsible for the deportation and killings of nationalist Lithuanians who became political opponents of the Soviets during the course of Soviet re-entry into the Baltic states on their drive to Berlin in 1944.

Stalin's protégé

In 1946, Suslov was made a member of the Orgburo and immediately became the Head of the Foreign Policy Department of the Central Committee. Within a year, Suslov was appointed Head of the Central Committee Department for Agitation and Propaganda. He also became a harsh critic of the Jewish Anti-Fascist Committee in the post-war years.

In 1947, Suslov was transferred to Moscow and elected to the Central Committee Secretariat; he would retain this seat for the rest of his life. Suslov had the full confidence of Stalin and in 1948 he was entrusted with the task of speaking on behalf of the Central Committee before a solemn meeting on the twenty-fourth anniversary of Vladimir Lenin's death. From September 1949 to 1950, he was editor-in-chief of the central Party daily Pravda.

In 1949, Suslov became a member, along with Georgy Malenkov, Lavrentiy Beria, and Lazar Kaganovich, of a commission created to investigate charges levied against Moscow's local Communist Party First Secretary, Georgy Popov. Russian historian Roy Medvedev speculates in his book, Neizvestnyi Stalin, that Stalin had made Suslov his "secret heir". Lavrentiy Beria, who hated Suslov, evidently felt so threatened by him that after his arrest, documents were found in Beria's safe labeling Suslov as the No. 1 person he wanted to "eliminate".

In June 1950, Suslov was elected to the Presidium of the Supreme Soviet. He was promoted to the CPSU Presidium (later known as the Politburo) in 1952 following the 19th Party Congress. He suffered a temporary reversal when Stalin died and was dismissed from the Presidium in 1953. He continued to work in the Supreme Soviet, even becoming Chairman of the Commission of Foreign Affairs in the years immediately following Stalin's death.

Khrushchev era

Suslov recovered his authority in 1955 and was elected to a seat in the Presidium, bypassing the customary candidate membership. In the 20th Party Congress of 1956, Khrushchev delivered the famous Secret Speech about Stalin's cult of personality. In Suslov's ideological report on 16 February, he updated his criticism of Stalin and his personality cult:

During the Hungarian Revolution of 1956, Suslov, along with Anastas Mikoyan, operated in close proximity to Budapest in order to direct the activities of the Soviet troops and to lend assistance to the new Hungarian leadership. Suslov and Mikoyan attended the Politburo meeting of the Hungarian Socialist Workers' Party which elected János Kádár to the office of General Secretary. In a telegram to the Soviet leadership, Suslov and Mikoyan acknowledged that the situation had become more dire, but both were content with the dismissal of Ernő Gerő as General Secretary and the choice of Kádár as his successor.

The Presidium of the Supreme Soviet criticised Suslov's and Mikoyan's concessions to the new government in the People's Republic of Hungary. Despite his initial reservations, Suslov eventually supported the Presidium's decision to intervene in Hungary militarily and replace the government's leadership there.

In June 1957, Suslov backed Khrushchev during his struggle with the Anti-Party Group led by Georgy Malenkov, Vyacheslav Molotov, Lazar Kaganovich, and Dmitry Shepilov. Mikoyan later wrote in his memoirs that he convinced Suslov to support Khrushchev by telling him that Khrushchev would emerge the winner even if he did not have enough support in the Presidium.

The following October Suslov accused Georgy Zhukov, the Minister of Defence, of "Bonapartism" at the Central Committee plenum that removed him from all Party and government posts. The removal of Zhukov had the effect of firmly subordinating the armed forces to Party control.

In a speech on 22 January 1958, Khrushchev officially proposed to dissolve the Machine and Tractor Stations (MTS), state organizations that owned and maintained the farm machinery used by kolkhozy. This reform had a particular significance in Soviet ideology. In Marxist-Leninist doctrine, cooperative ownership of property was considered a "lower" form of public ownership than state ownership. Khrushchev's proposal to expand cooperative ownership ran contrary to the Marxist theory as interpreted by Stalin.

Suslov, who supported Stalin's economic policy, regarded Khrushchev's proposal as unacceptable on ideological grounds. In an election speech to the Supreme Soviet in March 1958, Suslov refused to recognise the ideological significance of Khrushchev's reform, preferring instead to focus on the reform's practical benefits in improving productivity. Unlike other Party leaders, Suslov avoided mentioning Khrushchev as the MTS reform's initiator.

The 21st Party Congress convened in January 1959. Khrushchev wanted to consider the draft of a new Seven-Year plan. Suslov cautiously demonstrated against Khrushchev's statement that the country had developed from the socialist state of development to the higher state of communist development. He saw Khrushchev's view as flawed, and countered that his view had not been approved by the Party. To discredit Khrushchev's assertion further, Suslov invoked Karl Marx and Vladimir Lenin:

Suslov was becoming progressively more critical of Khrushchev's policies, his political intransigence, and his campaign to eliminate what was left of the Stalinist old guard. There were also deep-seated divergences in foreign and domestic policy between Suslov and Khrushchev. Suslov opposed the idea of improving Soviet Union–United States relations and was against Khrushchev's attempts at rapprochement with Yugoslavia. Domestically, Suslov opposed Khrushchev's policy of de-Stalinisation and his economic decentralisation scheme.

Suslov visited the United Kingdom in 1959 as a parliamentarian for the Supreme Soviet. The visit was a success, and Hugh Gaitskell, the Leader of the Labour Party, travelled to the Soviet Union later that year as a guest.

Sino–Soviet relations had long been strained and, as Suslov told the Central Committee in one of his reports, "The crux of the matter is that the Leadership of the CCP has recently developed tendencies to exaggerate the degree of maturity of socialist relations in China... There are elements of conceit and haughtiness. [These shortcomings] are largely explained by the atmosphere of the cult of personality of comrade Mao Zedong... who, by all accounts, himself has come to believe in his own infallibility." Suslov compared Mao's growing personality cult with that seen under Joseph Stalin.

Suslov was highly critical of Maoist China, as he led the Sino-Soviet Dispute and criticized Maoism in various ways under the Khrushchev administration, particularly its split from the Soviet leadership in the Socialist Camp, the rejection of the theory of Peaceful Coexistence, and Mao’s support of anti-Soviet rival communist militant groups globally. Suslov also compared Mao’s China to Titoist Yugoslavia and Trotskyism, and denounced him as a Bourgeois nationalist and left-deviationist.

In the years following the failure of the Anti-Party Group, Suslov became the leader of the faction in the Central Committee opposed to Khrushchev's leadership, known as the "Moscow faction". Khrushchev was able to hold on to power by conceding to various opposition demands in times of crisis, such as during the 1960 U-2 incident and the Cuban Missile Crisis. In the aftermath of the U-2 Crisis Suslov was able to remove, and replace, several of Khrushchev's appointees in the Politburo with new anti-Khrushchevist members. Khrushchev's position was greatly weakened further after the failure of the Cuban Missile Crisis, and Suslov's power greatly increased.

A campaign to oust Khrushchev from office was initiated in 1964. Although leader of the opposition, Suslov had fallen seriously ill during his trip to the People's Republic of China the previous year; instead, Leonid Brezhnev and Alexei Kosygin led the opposition.

Brezhnev era

Collective leadership

In October 1964, Khrushchev was ousted. Suslov played a crucial role in the event.

Suslov was, alongside Premier Alexei Kosygin and First Secretary Leonid Brezhnev, one of the most influential Soviet politicians of the 1960s following the ousting of Khrushchev. Having led the opposition against Khrushchev for years, Suslov had acquired and wielded great power within the Central Committee when Brezhnev rose to power. However, Suslov was never interested in becoming the leader of the Soviet Union, and was content to remain the man behind the scenes. During most of his term, Suslov was one of four people who had both a seat in the Secretariat and the Politburo; the three others were Brezhnev, Andrei Kirilenko and Fyodor Kulakov.

A collective leadership was founded immediately after Khrushchev's ouster, consisting of Brezhnev as First Secretary, Kosygin as head of government, and Anastas Mikoyan (and later Nikolai Podgorny) as head of state. From the beginning, Suslov was a vocal critic of one-man rule such as that seen under Joseph Stalin and Khrushchev.

While he condemned Stalin's one-man rule, he equally criticised the individualistic assertiveness of Khrushchev's de-Stalinisation policy. A strong supporter of democratic centralism, Suslov prevented Brezhnev from taking over Kosygin's post as head of government in 1970. Kirilenko, Brezhnev, and Suslov were members of an unofficial Troika within the Communist Party leadership. Suslov was ranked fourth in the Politburo hierarchy behind Brezhnev, Podgorny and Kosygin, ahead of Kirilenko.

Throughout the Brezhnev era, Suslov became increasingly hardline. Suslov was opposed to any sort of anti-Soviet policies attempted by the Eastern Bloc leaders, but voted against Soviet military intervention in the Czechoslovak Socialist Republic in 1968 during the Prague Spring. Suslov was regarded, according to Christian Schmidt-Häuer, as the "pope" for "Orthodox communists" in the Eastern Bloc. Throughout his political career, Suslov became increasingly concerned that the Soviet Union's leading role in the communist movement would be compromised. Häuer, in his book Gorbachev: The Path to Power, argues that Suslov "was a Russian nationalist" who believed "Russia was the centre of the universe".

It was during the Brezhnev era that Suslov was given the unofficial title "Chief Ideologue of the Communist Party". Suslov spent much time in memorializing the legacies of Vladimir Lenin, Karl Marx and Friedrich Engels. However, Suslov followed the party line and supported the retreat from some of the beliefs of Marxism-Leninism. Examples of ideological retreat include the end of single, Party-approved natural science versions of biology, chemistry and physics.

There still existed, on the other hand, a tight ideological control over literature. This included not only literature critical of Soviet rule: much of Lenin's work was also routinely censored.

Later life and death

At the beginning of the 1980s, the political and economic turmoil in the Polish People's Republic had seriously eroded the authority of the Polish United Workers' Party. Suslov's position on this matter carried particular weight as he chaired a Politburo Commission, established on 25 August 1980, on how to deal with the Polish crisis. Members of the commission included such high-ranking Soviets as KGB Chairman Andropov, Minister of Defence Dmitriy Ustinov, Minister of Foreign Affairs Andrei Gromyko, and Brezhnev's long-time associate Konstantin Chernenko.

On 28 August, the Commission considered Soviet military intervention to stabilize the region. Wojciech Jaruzelski, First Secretary of the Polish United Workers' Party, was able to persuade the Commission that a Soviet military intervention would only aggravate the situation. Suslov agreed with Jaruzelski's argument, stating that "if troops are introduced, that will mean a catastrophe. I think that we all share the unanimous opinion here that there can be no discussion of any introduction of troops". Suslov was able to persuade Jaruzelski and the Polish leadership to establish martial law in Poland.

In January 1982, Yuri Andropov revealed to Suslov that Semyon Tsvigun, the First Deputy Chairman of the KGB, had shielded Galina and Yuri, Brezhnev's children, from corruption investigations. When these facts were revealed to him, Suslov challenged Tsvigun to make a statement on the matter. Suslov even threatened Tsvigun with expulsion from the Communist Party, but Tsvigun died on 19 January 1982 before he could challenge Suslov's statement.

Two days later, Suslov had a coronary thrombosis, and died on 25 January of arteriosclerosis and diabetes at 16:05. His death is viewed as starting the battle to succeed Brezhnev, in which Andropov, who assumed Suslov's post as the Party's Second Secretary, sidelined Kirilenko and Chernenko during the last days of Brezhnev's rule.

Suslov was buried on 29 January at the Kremlin Wall Necropolis, in one of the twelve individual tombs located between the Lenin Mausoleum and the Kremlin wall. Brezhnev expressed great sadness at Suslov's passing.

Recognition
Suslov was awarded several decorations and medals during his life; among them were two Hero of Socialist Labour awards, five Orders of Lenin, one Order of the October Revolution, and one first degree Order of the Patriotic War. The USSR Academy of Sciences awarded Suslov the Gold Medal of Karl Marx. Suslov was awarded the highest state awards of the German Democratic Republic, the Mongolian People's Republic, and the Czechoslovak Socialist Republic.

Soviet Union

Foreign

Personal life
Suslov married Yelizaveta Alexandrovna (1903–1972), who worked as the Director of the Moscow Institute for Stomatology. In her life, she badly suffered from internal diseases, especially diabetes in a severe form, but ignored her physician's recommendations.

Bernard Lown, a Lithuanian-born American M.D., was once requested to see her in the Kremlin Hospital; it was one of the few cases where a renowned foreign doctor was invited to visit the Kremlin Hospital. Suslov expressed his gratitude for Lown's work, but avoided meeting Lown in person because he was a representative of an "imperialistic" country.

Yelizaveta and Suslov had two children, Revoly (born 1929), named after the Russian Revolution, and his second child, Maya (born 1939), named after May Day.

Antisemitism 
On 26 November 1946, Suslov sent a letter to Andrei Zhdanov, accusing the Jewish Anti-Fascist Committee of spying. Suslov's letter, which was well-received among Soviet leadership, would serve as the basis for prosecution of the Committee during the anti-cosmopolitan campaign. After becoming head of the Agitprop, at the height of the anti-cosmopolitan campaign, Suslov also purged Jews from media and public institutions.

References

Bibliography

External links 
 Selected Writings and Speeches published in 1980 by Pergamon Press.

1902 births
1982 deaths
People from Ulyanovsk Oblast
People from Khvalynsky Uyezd
Bolsheviks
Politburo of the Central Committee of the Communist Party of the Soviet Union members
Members of the Orgburo of the Central Committee of the Communist Party of the Soviet Union
Head of Propaganda Department of CPSU CC
First convocation members of the Supreme Soviet of the Soviet Union
Second convocation members of the Supreme Soviet of the Soviet Union
Third convocation members of the Supreme Soviet of the Soviet Union
Fourth convocation members of the Supreme Soviet of the Soviet Union
Fifth convocation members of the Supreme Soviet of the Soviet Union
Sixth convocation members of the Supreme Soviet of the Soviet Union
Seventh convocation members of the Supreme Soviet of the Soviet Union
Eighth convocation members of the Supreme Soviet of the Soviet Union
Ninth convocation members of the Supreme Soviet of the Soviet Union
Tenth convocation members of the Supreme Soviet of the Soviet Union
Members of the Supreme Soviet of the Russian Soviet Federative Socialist Republic, 1938–1947
Members of the Supreme Soviet of the Russian Soviet Federative Socialist Republic, 1947–1951
Members of the Supreme Soviet of the Russian Soviet Federative Socialist Republic, 1951–1955
Members of the Supreme Soviet of the Russian Soviet Federative Socialist Republic, 1955–1959
Members of the Supreme Soviet of the Russian Soviet Federative Socialist Republic, 1959–1963
Members of the Supreme Soviet of the Russian Soviet Federative Socialist Republic, 1963–1967
Members of the Supreme Soviet of the Russian Soviet Federative Socialist Republic, 1967–1971
Members of the Supreme Soviet of the Russian Soviet Federative Socialist Republic, 1971–1975
Members of the Supreme Soviet of the Russian Soviet Federative Socialist Republic, 1975–1980
Members of the Supreme Soviet of the Russian Soviet Federative Socialist Republic, 1980–1985
Russian communists
Russian atheists
Pravda people
Institute of Red Professors alumni
Academic staff of Moscow State University
Soviet military personnel of World War II
Soviet partisans
Heroes of Socialist Labour
Recipients of the Order of Lenin
Recipients of the Order of Georgi Dimitrov
Burials at the Kremlin Wall Necropolis
Antisemitism in the Soviet Union